Muthis may have been an ephemeral ancient Egyptian pharaoh of the Twenty-ninth Dynasty.

Biography
He is sometime reported as a son of Nepherites I who ruled for a brief time before being deposed by an usurper, Psammuthes. However, this statement is based on an interpretation of a passage in the Demotic Chronicle:
His son (i.e. of Nepherites I) was allowed to succeed him. (But) a short time was vouchsafed to him... Nevertheless, the Demotic Chronicle never mentions the name of Muthis and, as pointed out by the Egyptologist John D. Ray, "his son" could be a reference to Hakor instead.

It is also possible that Muthis was a very shadowly usurper, maybe related to the other usurper Psammuthes. Another option is that "Muthis" was simply a copying error, and therefore never existed; the latter hypothesis is supported by the fact that the name is clearly hellenized but there are no clues of what could have originally meant "Muthis" in Egyptian.

Attestations
His name does not appear on any monument, and he is only mentioned by Eusebius's Epithome of Manetho. Eusebius gave him a single year of reign and placed him at the very end of the dynasty, after Nepherites II; however, the Armenian version of Eusebius placed him between Psammuthes and Nepherites II.

References

Bibliography
Ray, J.D., 1986: "Psammuthis and Hakoris", The Journal of Egyptian Archaeology, 72: 149-158.

4th-century BC Pharaohs
Pharaohs of the Twenty-ninth Dynasty of Egypt
People whose existence is disputed
Year of birth unknown
Year of death unknown